Ruda is a small river in the Dalmatian Zagora region of Croatia. It is a left tributary of the Cetina river, into which it flows about 1 km north of Trilj. The Orlovac Hydroelectric Power Plant, located partly in the Split-Dalmatia County and partly in Bosnia and Herzegovina, discharges the water used to generates power into the Ruda river.

References

Rivers of Croatia
Landforms of Split-Dalmatia County
1Ruda